The Reluctant Saint is a 1962 American-Italian historical comedy drama film which tells the story of Joseph of Cupertino, a 17th-century Italian Conventual Franciscan friar and mystic honored as a saint by the Catholic Church.

It stars Maximilian Schell as Giuseppe Desa, as well as Ricardo Montalbán, Lea Padovani, Akim Tamiroff, and Harold Goldblatt. The movie was written by John Fante and Joseph Petracca and directed by Edward Dmytryk. It was made in Rome, with the film's sets designed by the art director, Mario Chiari.

Plot
Most of the key events in the movie are based on historical events or reports about the life of Saint Joseph of Cupertino. Born Giuseppe Desa, he was said to have been remarkably unclever, but was recorded by many witnesses during his life as prone to miraculous levitation and intense ecstasies.

The film begins with Giuseppe (Maximilian Schell) spending his final days at home with his mother (Lea Padovani). Because of his slow wits, she has kept him in school despite his being a grown man, older than the other students. He is seen bearing patiently and good-heartedly the ridicule of his fellow villagers, and enduring failed attempts at work as a laborer. At the insistence of his mother (who saw no viable alternatives), he enters a Franciscan friary through the influence of his uncle (Harold Goldblatt), an authority in the religious order. But trouble follows Giuseppe wherever he goes, including the friary, because of his slow wits. Eventually, his good heart is noticed by the visiting Bishop Durso, (Akim Tamiroff), who orders that he be trained to be a priest.

Despite Giuseppe's incapacity for the necessary scholarly studies, and preference for just managing the sheep and other animals in the friary's stable, he is ordained a priest. Although he learns little from the tutoring by the friars, Giuseppe passes the necessary examinations for the priesthood through a series of unlikely or possibly miraculous events. Soon after, when Giuseppe is seen levitating during ecstatic prayer to the Blessed Virgin Mary and during conventual Mass, one of the superiors in the community, Father Raspi (Ricardo Montalbán), claims that Giuseppe suffers from demonic possession. Giuseppe is bound in chains by his brother friars and then exorcised, but his levitations continue, persuading everyone—including his former critic—of the divine origins of his powers.

Cast
 Maximilian Schell as Giuseppe 
 Ricardo Montalbán as Father Raspi 
 Lea Padovani as Giuseppe's Mother 
 Akim Tamiroff as Bishop Durso 
 Harold Goldblatt as Father Giovanni 
 Arnoldo Foà as Felixa - Giuseppe's Father 
 Carlo Croccolo as The Gobbo - the Hunchback 
 Giulio Bosetti as Brother Orlando
 Elisa Cegani as Sister 
 Giacomo Rossi Stuart as Young Examining Prelate 
 Tonio Selwart as Examining Prelate 
 Odoardo Spadaro as Old Examining Prelate

Reception
A TV Guide review says: "A light-hearted tone is kept throughout, but the stereotyped performances, unbelievable settings, and lifeless direction hurt whatever promises are inherent in the material". Other more favorable reviews can be found at IMDB.com: https://www.imdb.com/title/tt0056403/reviews?ref_=tt_urv
as well as decentfilms.com: http://decentfilms.com/articles/reluctantsaint

References

External links

1962 films
Films about Catholicism
1962 drama films
Films about Catholic priests
Films scored by Nino Rota
Films directed by Edward Dmytryk
Films set in the 17th century
Italian historical drama films
American historical drama films
1960s historical drama films
English-language Italian films
1960s English-language films
1960s American films
1960s Italian films